Barbatula altayensis is one of seventeen species of ray-finned fish in the genus Barbatula. It is found in Mongolia and Xinjiang Province in China.

References 

 

altayensis
Fish described in 1992